The Rock and Blues Custom Show is a four-day rock music festival held annually at Pentrich, England. It usually takes place on the last Thursday to Sunday in July.

References

Music festivals in Derbyshire
Rock festivals in England
1983 establishments in England
Recurring events established in 1983